Laura Agea (born 17 February 1978) is an Italian politician and Member of the European Parliament from Italy. She is a member of Five Star Movement, part of the Europe for Freedom and Democracy.

References

External links

Official website of Laura Agea

1978 births
Living people
People from Narni
Five Star Movement MEPs
MEPs for Italy 2014–2019
21st-century women MEPs for Italy